Events from the year 1998 in Scotland.

Incumbents 

 Secretary of State for Scotland and Keeper of the Great Seal – Donald Dewar

Law officers 
 Lord Advocate – Lord Hardie
 Solicitor General for Scotland – Colin Boyd

Judiciary 
 Lord President of the Court of Session and Lord Justice General – Lord Rodger of Earlsferry
 Lord Justice Clerk – Lord Cullen
 Chairman of the Scottish Land Court – Lord McGhie

Events 
 7 March – Outer Hebrides community radio station Isles FM is launched, broadcasting from studios in Stornoway.
 31 March – The last Northern Lighthouse Board lighthouse is converted to automatic operation without resident keepers, Fair Isle South.
 25 May – Torness Nuclear Power Station commissioned near the town of Dunbar, East Lothian.
 31 May – The Sky Scottish satellite television channel closes after eighteen months on air.
 10 June – Scotland open the 1998 World Cup, playing champions Brazil in France, though they lose 2-1 after a deflected goal in the seventy-sixth minute.
 16 June – Scotland draw 1–1 against Norway in their second game of the World Cup.
 23 June – Scotland lose 3–0 to Morocco in their final group stage match of the world Cup, failing to qualify for the next round.
 August – Edinburgh Modular Arm System, the world's first bionic arm, is fitted.
 24 August – The Netherlands is selected as the venue for the trial of the two Libyans who are charged with the Lockerbie aircraft bombing that killed 270 people in December 1988.
 5 October – Fife radio station Kingdom FM is launched, broadcasting from studios in Markinch.
 November – Scottish Socialist Party established.
 19 November – The Scotland Act, the legislation to set up a devolved unicameral Scottish Parliament, receives its royal assent.
 30 November – new Museum of Scotland opened in Edinburgh.
 26 December – great Boxing Day Storm: severe gale force winds hit Ireland, southern Scotland and northern England. Roads, railways and electricity are disrupted.

Births 
 1 March – Mili Smith, curler
 23 May – Ross Cunningham, footballer
 19 July – Erin Cuthbert, footballer
 20 October – Jordan Allan, footballer

Deaths 
 10 March – Ian Dunn, gay and paedophile rights activist, founder of the Scottish Minorities Group (born 1943)
 7 April – James McIntosh Patrick, landscape painter (born 1907)
 15 October – Iain Crichton Smith, poet (born 1928)
 21 October – Sir Alec Cairncross, economist (born 1911)
 November – Robin Hall, folk singer (born 1936)
 8 November – Rumer Godden, novelist (born 1907 in England)

The arts
 Martyn Bennett's Celtic fusion album Bothy Culture is released.
 Kevin MacNeil's poetry collection Love and Zen in the Outer Hebrides is published in Edinburgh.
 The BBC Scotland television drama Looking After Jo Jo, starring Robert Carlyle, is screened.

See also 
 1998 in Northern Ireland

References 

 
Scotland
Years of the 20th century in Scotland
1990s in Scotland